Orson Knapp Miller Jr. (December 19, 1930 – June 9, 2006) was an American mycologist. He published numerous papers in mycology and was responsible for the naming of many taxa, as well as being one of the authors erecting the genus Chroogomphus. He described Omphalotus olivascens, several species of Amanita, and the ghoul fungus Hebeloma aminophilum.

He married Hope Hartigan Miller in 1953; both were mycologists and published books, including at least one together. Hope died on September 26, 2018.

Works

His books include:
 Mushrooms of North America (1972) 
 Gasteromycetes: Morphological and Developmental Features with Keys to the Orders, Families, and Genera (1988) 
 North American Mushrooms: A Field Guide to Edible and Inedible Fungi (2006)  (with Hope H. Miller)

Awards and honors

He received the William H. Weston Award for Teaching Excellence in Mycology, and the Distinguished Mycologist Award. Several fungus species have been named in his honor, including:
Amanita orsonii Ash.Kumar & T.N. Lakh. (1990)
Clitocybe milleri H.E.Bigelow (1985)
Crepidotus milleri Hesler & A.H.Sm. (1965)
Entoloma milleri Noordel. (2004)
Pholiota milleri A.H. Sm. & Hesler (1968)
Plectania milleri Paden & Tylutki (1969)
Tylopilus orsonianus Fulgenzi & T.W.Henkel (2007)

References

External links
Obituary

1930 births
2006 deaths
American mycologists
Botanists with author abbreviations